HPC may refer to:

Computing
 High-performance computing
 HPC Challenge Benchmark
 Hasty Pudding cipher, in cryptography

Science and medicine
 Health Professions Council, a UK regulator, later Health and Care Professions Council
 Hemangiopericytoma, a type of soft tissue sarcoma
 Hilbert system, also referred to as Hilbert Propositional Calculus
 History of presenting complaint, in a medical history in UK
 Hot potassium carbonate, a method for carbon dioxide removal in gas streams
 Hydroxypropyl cellulose, a derivative of cellulose
 Heterotrophic Plate Count a procedure for estimating the number of live, culturable heterotrophic bacteria in water

Other uses
 Hinkley Point C nuclear power station, under construction in England
 Hmar People's Convention, a political party in India
 Ho-Ping Power Company, an independent power producer in Taiwan
 Hydraulic Press Channel, a YouTube channel
 Hydrometeorological Prediction Center, former name of the US Weather Prediction Center
 Croatian Orthodox Church
 Hi-Point Carbine, a pistol-caliber rifle manufactured by Hi-Point Firearms

See also
 Windows HPC Server 2008, an operating system for high-performance computing by Microsoft